Biederman, may refer to:

People

Charles Biederman, (1906–2004), an American abstract artist
Charlie Biederman, (1918–1995) was a musher in Alaska best known for being the last surviving dog sled mail carrier in the United States
Dan Biederman, an American urban redevelopment expert
Don Biederman, 1940–1999), a Canadian stock car racer
Joseph Biederman, (Born 1947), is Chief of the Clinical and Research Programs in Pediatric Psychopharmacology at Massachusetts General Hospital and a professor of psychiatry at Harvard Medical School
Irving Biederman, (born 1939), an American vision scientist, best known for his Recognition-by-components theory.
Les Biederman, (1907–1981), an American sports writer and columnist.
Oto Biederman, (born 1973), a Czech serial killer.

Places
Biederman's Cabin, also known as Biederman's Fish Camp, a historic cabin on the Yukon River in Alaska

Fictional characters
Leo Biederman, leading character played by Elijah Wood in the 1998 Deep Impact (film)

German-language surnames